This is a list of U.S. state government budgets as enacted by each state's legislature.  Note that a number of states have a two-year or three year budget (e.g.: Kentucky) while others have a one-year budget (e.g.: Massachusetts).

See also
 United States federal budget
 List of government budgets by country
 List of U.S. states by credit rating

References

Further reading

Budgets
Budgets
 Budgets
Budgets